Quad City Mallards has been the name of two professional ice hockey franchises in Moline, Illinois:
Quad City Mallards (1995–2007), a team which played in the Colonial Hockey League and United Hockey League from 1995 to 2007
Quad City Mallards, a team that formerly played in the International Hockey League beginning in 2009, the Central Hockey League from 2010 to 2014, and then joined the ECHL